The Barwon Highway is one of the shorter state highways of Queensland, Australia. It starts at the Carnarvon Highway in Nindigully, 44 kilometres south of St George, and travels east for about 155 kilometres until it reaches Goondiwindi, where it terminates at the Leichhardt Highway.

The highway travels north of and roughly parallel to the Barwon River, after which it is named.  The river forms part of the border between Queensland and New South Wales.

State route 85

Stock route
Like many Australian roads, the Barwon Highway follows a declared stock route. The road reserve for most stock routes is wider than for other roads (up to 1600 metres). When seen from the air (or in the Satellite view of Google maps) the substantial width of the western end (from Nindigully to Talwood) can be clearly seen due to the difference in colour between roadside brigalow scrub and adjacent cropland.

Upgrades

Pavement widening
A project to widen sections of pavement on the highway, at a cost of $6.75 million, was expected to complete in June 2022.

Major intersections

See also

 Highways in Australia
 List of highways in Queensland
 Brigalow Belt
 List of highways numbered 85

References

Highways in Queensland